Acrocercops theaeformisella is a moth of the family Gracillariidae. It is known from Madagascar.

The larvae feed on Aphloia theiformis. They probably mine the leaves of their host plant.

References

theaeformisella
Moths described in 1955
Moths of Madagascar